Terrence Oung (born 24 August 1935) is a Burmese boxer. He competed in the men's light welterweight event at the 1956 Summer Olympics.

References

External links
 

1935 births
Living people
Burmese male boxers
Olympic boxers of Myanmar
Boxers at the 1956 Summer Olympics
Place of birth missing (living people)
Light-welterweight boxers